Terrabona is a municipality in the Matagalpa department of Nicaragua.

Municipalities of the Matagalpa Department